The Castle Reef Dolomite is a geologic formation in Montana. It preserves fossils dating back to the Carboniferous period. Castle Reef is the type locality.

See also

 List of fossiliferous stratigraphic units in Montana
 Paleontology in Montana

References
 

Carboniferous Montana